Kenchester is a parish in Herefordshire, England.

History
Kenchester is near the Romano-British town of Magnis. It was once part of the Angles'  Magonsæte kingdom.

Landmarks
The Church of St Michael is a Grade I listed building.

References

External links

Civil parishes in Herefordshire